Pala Singh (born 1902, date of death unknown) was an Indian middle-distance runner. He competed in the men's 1500 metres at the 1924 Summer Olympics.

References

External links
 

1902 births
Year of death missing
Athletes (track and field) at the 1924 Summer Olympics
Indian male middle-distance runners
Indian male long-distance runners
Olympic athletes of India
Place of birth missing